Michael Heller may refer to:

Michał Heller (born 1936), Polish professor of philosophy, cosmologist and priest
Michael Heller (poet) (born 1937), American poet, essayist and critic
Michael Heller (law professor), American professor of property rights and ownership
Michel Heller (1922–1997), Russian emigre political scientist
Michael Heller (businessman) (1936–2023), British business executive and philanthropist
Mike Heller (born 1982), drummer